Suzelia coccinea is a species of beetle in the family Cerambycidae, and the only species in the genus Suzelia. It was described by Henry Walter Bates in 1879.

References

Dorcasominae
Beetles described in 1879
Monotypic beetle genera